is a professional footballer currently playing as a defender for Blackburn Rovers. Born in Hong Kong, he is a youth international for Japan.

Club career
Haddow started his career with Kitchee in Hong Kong, where he played from the age of eight until twelve. He moved to England and signed for Blackburn Rovers in 2016. Haddow signed a 2 year scholarship term with Blackburn Rovers in July 2020. During his scholarship Haddow made 40 appearances for the U18’s and 12 appearances for the U23’s in all competitions.

On July 14th 2022, it was announced that Haddow had signed a professional contract with Blackburn RoversDespite interest from other Premier League and Championship clubs, Haddow signed for Blackburn, signing a 2 year contract up until the summer of 2024.

International career
Born in Hong Kong to a Japanese mother and British father, Haddow is eligible to represent Japan, England and Scotland at international level. In May 2022, Haddow was called up to the Japan national under-19 football team for the first time ahead of the 2022 Maurice Revello Tournament. Haddow made his Japan U19's debut against Comoros U21's coming on as a substitue in the 55th Minute.

Personal life
Haddow grew up in Discovery Bay, Hong Kong and was educated at Discovery College as a primary school student. 

Haddow then spent 1 year at Island School before moving to the United Kingdom.

References

2004 births
Living people
People educated at Island School
Japanese footballers
Japan youth international footballers
Hong Kong footballers
English footballers
Japanese people of English descent
Japanese people of Scottish descent
Hong Kong people of English descent
Hong Kong people of Scottish descent
Hong Kong people of Japanese descent
Association football defenders
Kitchee SC players
Blackburn Rovers F.C. players